Alice Fraser is an Australian comedian, writer, podcaster, and actor.

Early life and education 
Fraser studied law at the University of Sydney before going on to earn a master's degree in English literature (Rhetoric) in Cambridge, England. Fraser returned to Australia and in 2013, she was nominated as best newcomer at the Sydney Comedy Festival.

Career 
Fraser made her film debut in the movie Never Hesitate as Emily in 2014. Also in 2014, Fraser spoke at a TEDx event at Macquarie University.

Trilogy
In 2015 Fraser began touring Savage, the first part of what she describes as an "unorthodox art-comedy/morality tale trilogy" which focuses on her upbringing and its impact on her life. The trilogy was completed by The Resistance in 2016 and Empire in 2017.

Each installment of the trilogy was toured nationally and performed at the Melbourne Comedy Festival, Sydney Comedy Festival and The Edinburgh Fringe. Reviewing Empire, The Herald Sun called it a "beautifully word-rich performance" and said that Fraser's "interesting conversation makes her the perfect dinner guest – and comedian". Empire was also performed at the Edinburgh Fringe. The Alice Fraser Trilogy was commissioned as a six part podcast series on ABC Radio Podcasts.

Podcasting 
In January 2017, Fraser received a Tomorrow Maker grant for her podcast, Tea with Alice. Previous guests on the podcast have included Wil Anderson, Neil Gaiman and Richard Herring. The Tea With Alice podcast is funded by Fraser's Patreon.

In 2017, Fraser became a semi-regular co-host on the long running British podcast The Bugle, hosted by Andy Zaltzman. In January 2020, she launched The Bugle Presents... The Last Post, a daily 15-minute podcast of news from an alternate dimension, which The Guardian described as addressing topical issues "with impressive zeal and a clever script". In February 2021, Fraser began hosting The Gargle, a weekly podcast discussing non-political news stories, describing itself as the "audio glossy magazine" to The Bugle's audio newspaper.

in 2019 and 2020, Fraser worked with neuroscientist Ash Ranpura on a number of documentaries produced by Somethin' Else for Audible, including the bestselling In The Habit: Introduction to Habit Change. Fraser also created and cohosted a show for BBC Radio with astrophysicist and science educator Jen Gupta, called Stranger Than Sci Fi.

Fraser is a regular writer and guest on the BBC Radio panel show The News Quiz.

Video games 
Fraser appeared in voiceover in the 2020 game Watch Dogs: Legion, as co-host with Andy Zaltzman of fictional radio station The Bug, in the style of her work with Zaltzman on The Bugle.

Personal life 
Fraser's paternal grandfather was a naturalised Briton, born Adolf Friedenberg, later changing his name to Andrew Peter Fraser. Her father is a Jewish-turned-Buddhist professor of law named Michael Fraser.

She has a twin brother, musician and philosopher Henry Fraser.

Works

Comedy shows

Podcasts

References

Living people
Actresses from Sydney
Australian film actresses
Australian stand-up comedians
Writers from Sydney
University of Sydney alumni
Alumni of the University of Cambridge
Date of birth missing (living people)
Year of birth missing (living people)